Borrowby is a village and civil parish in the Scarborough district of North Yorkshire, England. The village is situated in the North York Moors National Park, inland but near the coast, between Whitby and Saltburn-by-the-Sea. The population of the civil parish was estimated at 50 in 2014. According to the 2001 UK census, Borrowby parish had a population of 56.

References

External links

Villages in North Yorkshire
Civil parishes in North Yorkshire